Felicia Ospitaletche (born 7 December 1953) is a Uruguayan former swimmer. She competed at the 1968 Summer Olympics and the 1972 Summer Olympics.

References

1953 births
Living people
Uruguayan female swimmers
Olympic swimmers of Uruguay
Swimmers at the 1968 Summer Olympics
Swimmers at the 1972 Summer Olympics
Sportspeople from Montevideo